Raul J. Fernandez (born c. 1966 in Washington, D.C.) is an entrepreneur, investor, philanthropist and strategic partner. He is the Vice Chairman and Owner of Monumental Sports & Entertainment, as well as a Special Advisor to General Atlantic Partners. In 1991, he founded, took public and later sold Proxicom (NASDAQ: PXCM), an internet development and e-business consulting company, to Dimension Data at a transaction valued at $450 million. Fernandez serves as a Director for Broadcom (NASDAQ: AVGO), DXC Technology (NYSE: DXC), GameStop (NYSE: GME), InSite, PerfectSense Digital, SyncThink, URBANEER, and was previously a Director from 2001-2017 and Chairman of the Compensation Committee for Kate Spade & Company before they were sold to Tapestry (NYSE: TPR) in July 2017. He is a current Chairman of the Board for RemoteRetail, and ObjectVideo, a technology company sold to Alarm.com in 2017, and named a 2005 Technology Pioneer by the World Economic Forum.

Fernandez, a native Washingtonian, is an active philanthropist in D.C. regional nonprofits, focusing his energy primarily on educational reform. In 2000 he co-founded Venture Philanthropy Partners (VPP), a philanthropic investment organization based in Washington, DC. Mr. Fernandez is a board member of DC College Access Program (DC-CAP), the DC Public Education Fund, and the Fernandez Foundation, and was previously the Chairman of Fight for Children.

Early life and education 
Fernandez grew up in Silver Spring, Maryland with his family. He is the son of a Cuban father and an Ecuadorian mother. While a student at St. John's College High School, he attended a Capitol Hill fundraiser for Hispanic Republicans with his father. One of his father's friends introduced him to Congressman Jack Kemp's chief of staff leading Fernandez to a part-time intern position translating Spanish documents. During this time he was given his first laptop computer and was his high school yearbook caption read, "Most remembered for being the first to have a computer."

Fernandez went on to attend University of Maryland. While attending the University of Maryland, he continued to work for Kemp. On Capitol Hill he worked on tax legislation and issues involving Central America using spreadsheets and programs he developed to simulate the impact of various tax plans on different income groups. He went on to graduate from the University of Maryland with a bachelor's degree in economics in 1989 before settling in Washington DC.

Proxicom 
In 1991, Fernandez left his job at Digicon and founded Proxicom with $40,000. Under his leadership, the company became a top global provider of e-business services for Fortune 500 companies. Proxicom's ultimate success was sealed with the signing of two big clients in the mid90s MCI and AOL. Fernandez met AOL's Ted Leonsis on an airplane on his way back from launching one of the first e-commerce Web sites for MCI. The subsequent deals from AOL led to growth, venture investments and the Proxicom's eventual $58.5 million IPO in 1999. In 2000, Proxicom generated more than $200 million in revenue.

In late 2000, Proxicom gathered interest from two buyers: Compaq and Dimension Data. A bidding war ensued and Proxicom was bought by Dimension Data.

From 2000 to 2002, he served as Chief Executive Officer for Dimension Data North America, and as a Director of its parent company, Dimension Data Holdings Plc, in 2001.

Monumental Sports & Entertainment 

Raul is the Vice Chairman and Owner of Monumental Sports & Entertainment, a private partnership which owns the NBA’s Washington Wizards, the NHL’s 2018 Stanley Cup Champion Washington Capitals, the WNBA’s Washington Mystics, the AFL's Washington Valor and Baltimore Brigade, and owns and operates the Capital One Arena in Washington, DC.

In 2018 it was unveiled that through Monumental Sports & Entertainment this would be the inaugural year for the Wizards District Gaming team, an NBA 2K League team in the esports community, and the Capital City Go-Go, the Washington Wizards NBA G League team. Monumental Sports is also a member of the investment group, aXiomatic, which owns Team Liquid, an eSports Team based in Los Angeles, CA.

Monumental Sports also manages the EagleBank Arena on George Mason University's campus, and the Medstar Capitals Iceplex where the Washington Capitals train and practice. The facility houses two NHL-sized ice rinks, a pro shop, administrative offices, event space and media facilities.

He continues to expand his work with companies in sports and new ways to watch, as with Kiswe Mobile, a mobile applications company that features multi-camera streaming of sports events.

Current Ventures 

In addition to his current involvement with Monumental Sports & Entertainment, he is an active technology investor in disruptive companies across multiple verticals across all growth stages. He is the Chairman of a leading SaaS fashion company, RemoteRetail that is partnered with top brands such as Cosabella and ELOQUII. Fernandez is also an investor in Radius Networks, a leading provider of proximity technology solutions for major retailers, restaurant chains, sports and entertainment complexes.

He is a current investor in neurotechnology and brain health analytics company, SyncThink. SyncThink is the developer of the EYE-SYNC technology..

He is an investor in the Professional Fighters League, the world's only major mixed martial arts league. In addition to traditional professional sports teams, Fernandez has invested in the top team in eSports, Cloud9, a North American eSports team out of Los Angeles.

Through his experience with investing and advising the Kate Spade & Company, he also advises and has invested in, and Bedrock Manufacturing, the parent of two American brands, Shinola and Filson.

Philanthropy 

Mr. Fernandez, a native Washingtonian, is an active philanthropist in D.C. regional nonprofits, focusing his energy primarily on educational reform. In 2000 he co-founded Venture Philanthropy Partners (VPP), a philanthropic investment organization based in Washington, D.C. Mr. Fernandez is also the Chairman of Fight for Children, and a board member of DC College Access Program (DC-CAP), the DC Public Education Fund, and the Fernandez Foundation.

Ties to government 
In 2001, Fernandez was appointed to the President's Council of Advisors on Science and Technology. He also led the Information Technology Analysis Team for Virginia Gov. Mark Warner's Commission on Efficiency and Effectiveness.

External links
 Bio at Object Video

References

Living people
American chief executives
Businesspeople in software
American people of Cuban descent
American people of Ecuadorian descent
National Basketball Association executives
National Basketball Association owners
National Hockey League executives
National Hockey League owners
University System of Maryland alumni
Washington Capitals owners
Washington Mystics owners
Washington Wizards owners
Year of birth missing (living people)
1960s births